Jules François Mabille (Tours, 5 December 1831 − 18 January 1904) was a French malacologist, biologist and zoologist who in many trips around the world discovered and studied many species of mollusc.

In 1882−83 Mabille participated in the French scientific expedition to Cape Horn and the South Seas, with his fellow malacologist Alphonse Trémeau de Rochebrune and they described many new species of mollusc.  His extensive research was written up in 1889.

References

External links
 

1831 births
1904 deaths
French malacologists